The Chin Shan Yen Hui Chi Temple is a temple in Shilin District, Taipei, Taiwan.

History
The temple was constructed in 1752–1764. Afterwards, it has been rebuilt five times until its current structure stands since 1968. The Lin Shuangwen rebellion broke out in 1786–1788 to fight against the Qing Dynasty by attacking Chi Shan Yen. It resulted the death of many Shilin people near the temple. A table was then erected at the temple to commemorate of the incident.

Architecture
The temple is built with concrete decorated with stone sculpture. The front hall is dedicated to Three Sovereigns and Five Emperors, Kai Zhang Sheng Wang, the upper floor is dedicated to Wenchang Wang and the lower hall is dedicated to Avalokiteśvara.

Transportation
The temple is accessible within walking distance east of Zhishan Station of Taipei Metro.

See also
 Chin Shan Yen Gate
 Shilin Shennong Temple, Shilin District
 Shengwang Temple, Changhua County
 Yong'an Temple, Yunlin County
 List of temples in Taiwan
 List of tourist attractions in Taiwan

References

1764 establishments in Taiwan
Taoist temples in Taipei